Environment Five is the fifth in The Future Sound of London's "Environments" series of albums, released on 8 September 2014 on CD, on vinyl and as a download.  According to the band's website, the album features only new material.

Track listing
 "Point of Departure" (6:28)
 "Source of Uncertainty" (1:53)
 "Image of the Past" (4:29)
 "Beings of Light" (2:54)
 "In Solitude We Are Least Alone" (8:05)
 "Viewed From Below The Surface" (3:14)
 "Multiples" (1:10)
 "Dying While Being Held" (2:53)
 "Machines of the Subconscious" (2:56)
 "Dark and Lonely Waters" (2:11)
 "Somatosensory" (5:19)
 "The Dust Settles" (4:16)
 "Moments of Isolation" (7:00)

Pre-release and limited time post-release purchases came with a three-song digital download of tracks
 "Electric Brain Storm" (3:40)
 "The Final Inner Breath" (5:09)
 "HereAfter" (6:11)

External links

2014 albums
The Future Sound of London albums